Sami Dia Said (born 1964) is a retired lieutenant general in the United States Air Force, who last served as the Inspector General of the Air Force. In this capacity, he reports to the Secretary of the Air Force, Chief of Staff of the Air Force, and Chief of Space Operations on matters concerning Department of the Air Force readiness, efficiency and the military discipline of active duty, Air Force Reserve and Air National Guard forces. He also provides inspection policy and oversees the inspection and evaluation system for all Department of the Air Force nuclear and conventional forces; oversees Department of the Air Force counterintelligence operations; investigates fraud, waste and abuse; oversees criminal investigations; and provides oversight of complaints resolution programs. Said is responsible for three field operating agencies: the Air Force Inspection Agency, the Office of Special Investigations, and the Department of Defense Cyber Crime Center.

Said is a command pilot with more than 2,200 hours in both the F-15 Eagle and the F-16 Fighting Falcon. Said's combat flying experience includes operations Northern Watch and Southern Watch. Said has commanded at the wing and squadron level. His staff and joint experience include assignments at Headquarters United States Air Force; the Office of the Secretary of Defense; Headquarters, International Security Assistance Force, Kabul, Afghanistan; Department of State, Washington, D.C. and U.S. Embassy, Kabul, Afghanistan. Prior to this assignment, Said was the Deputy Inspector General of the Air Force, Office of the Secretary of the Air Force, Arlington, Virginia. 

Said is a 1986 graduate of the University of Alabama at Birmingham. Said also received his Master of Business Administration from the Western Governors University.

As Air Force Inspector General, Lieutenant General Sami Said determined that the military’s domestic use of reconnaissance aircraft (RC-26 planes) during the summer 2020 protests was legal and not aimed at protestors.

Said did not prosecute anyone for the U.S. military’s August 2021 drone strike in Kabul, Afghanistan, that killed 10 civilians, including an aid worker and his children.

Retirement 
Sami Said joined Raytheon Technologies’ Intelligence & Space business as vice president of global security in April 2022.

Awards and decorations

Effective dates of promotions

References

Living people
1964 births
Western Governors University alumni
Recipients of the Defense Superior Service Medal
Recipients of the Legion of Merit